Zaysan or Zaisan (Zaisan), is a town in the East Kazakhstan Region of Kazakhstan, the administrative center of Zaysan District. It is situated near the southeastern corner of Lake Zaysan at an altitude of 660 meters (2170 ft) above sea level. Population:   The town is located near the eastern terminus of European route E127, which connects it with Omsk in Russia as well as the rest of the European route network.

History
Zaysan was founded in 1868 as a Russian military post.

Climate 
Zaysan has a hot-summer humid continental climate (Köppen climate classification Dfa).

References

External links
Zaysan Post, Kazakhstan, 1875

Populated places in East Kazakhstan Region
Semipalatinsk Oblast
Populated places established in 1868